Asmat Ali Sikder is a Bangladeshi Awami League politician and the former Member of Parliament of Patuakhali-1.

Career
Sikder was an organizer of Bangladesh Liberation war. He was elected to parliament from Patuakhali-1 as a Bangladesh Awami League candidate in 1973.

References

Awami League politicians
Living people
1st Jatiya Sangsad members
Year of birth missing (living people)